Neutral site may refer to:

 Home advantage#Neutral venues in sports
 Neutral site (genetics)